Benalbanach was a 7,803 ton heavy lift cargo ship which was built in 1946 as Empire Athelstan. In 1947 she was sold and renamed Benalbanach. Further name changes were Camelot in 1965 and Dragon Castle in 1969. She was scrapped in 1975.

History

Empire Athelstan
Empire Athelstan was the first postwar merchant ship built by Vickers-Armstrongs at Barrow in Furness. She was yard number 94, launched on 15 January 1946 and completed in June 1946. She was built for the Ministry of Transport and initially managed by P Hendersonn & Co, and then by Alfred Holt & Co. In April 1947, Empire Athelstan was put up for sale by tender, at a minimum purchase price of £340,000, with delivery after 31 May and before 31 August 1947.

Empire Athelstan was powered by two Metropolitan-Vickers steam turbines, double reduction geared to one screw. She could achieve . She had two derricks with a lifting capacity of 120 tons.

Benalbanach
In 1947, Empire Athelstan was sold to E G Thompson (Shipping) Ltd, Leith, who traded as Ben Line Steamers Ltd. She was renamed Benalbanach, the second of five Ben Line ships to bear that name. In 1949, Benalbanach transported military supplies to Malaya and Hong Kong, the latter as defence against incursions from mainland China then involved in a Civil War. She served with Ben Line until 1963 when she was laid up at Hartlepool. In 1965 she was sold to the Ministry of Transport and renamed Camelot.

Camelot
Camelot was placed under the management of the British India Steam Navigation Co Ltd. In February 1968 she was laid up in the River Fal. In 1969, ownership of Camelot passed to the Sea Transport Branch of the Board of Trade. Later that year, she was sold to Mercur Shipping Enterprise, Panama and renamed Dragon Castle.

Dragon Castle
Dragon Castle was operated by Mercur for six years. In 1975, she was sold to Cuatebol Shipping S.A., Panama, operating under the management of Societa Italia Gestioni, Italy. Later that year, she was sold to Brodospas for scrap, arriving at Split, Yugoslavia on 5 December 1975.

Trivia 
As "Benalbanach" this Ship is seen for few seconds in the German criminal series "Stahlnetz 04 - Die Tote im Hafenbecken" ("the dead in the harbor basin") of 1959, anchoring in Hamburg harbour, at the moment when the victim is found by harbour employers.

Official Number and code letters
Official Numbers were a forerunner to IMO Numbers.

Empire Athelstan, Benalbanach and Camelot had the UK Official Number 169213. Empire Athelstan used Code Letters GKJD. Benalbanach, Camelot and  Dragon Castle had the IMO Number 5040869.

References

External links
 Photo of Benalbanach

1946 ships
Ships built in Barrow-in-Furness
Empire ships
Merchant ships of the United Kingdom
Steamships of the United Kingdom
Merchant ships of Panama
Steamships of Panama